The Milicz Ponds are a group of about 285 fish ponds in Lower Silesian Voivodeship, south-western Poland, in the valley of the river Barycz, close to the towns of Milicz and Żmigród.

Due to their importance as a habitat and breeding ground for water birds, the ponds are a nature reserve (established 1963, area ), which is protected under the Ramsar convention (one of 13 such sites in Poland). Since 1996 it has also formed part of the larger protected area known as the Barycz Valley Landscape Park.

References

Lakes of Poland
Ramsar sites in Poland
Ponds of Europe
Lakes of Lower Silesian Voivodeship
Fishing in Poland